(also known as A Slit-Mouthed Woman) is a 2007 Japanese horror film directed by Kōji Shiraishi and written by Shiraishi and Naoyuki Yokota. Based on the Japanese urban legend known as Kuchisake-onna, or "the Slit-Mouthed Woman", the film stars Eriko Sato as Kyōko Yamashita, a divorced mother and teacher who attempts to solve a series of child abduction cases with the help of her co-worker Noboru Matsuzaki, played by Haruhiko Kato.

The film was followed by a prequel, Carved 2: The Scissors Massacre, in 2008.

Plot
As stories about Kuchisake-onna ("The Slit-Mouthed Woman") spread through a Japanese town, an earthquake causes a corpse matching the entity's description to break out of a closet in an abandoned house. As this occurs, Noboru Matsuzaki, an elementary school teacher, hears a voice ask, "Am I pretty?" At a playground, a boy who had gone looking for Kuchisake-onna with his friends is grabbed by the entity.

The boy's disappearance prompts the school where Noboru works to send students home in groups, escorted by staff members. Mika Sasaki is reluctant to go home, admitting to a teacher, Kyōko, that her mother hits her. Kyōko has a troubled relationship with her own daughter, who lives with her ex-husband, and becomes agitated when Mika says she hates her mother, causing Mika to run away. Mika encounters Kuchisake-onna, whose appearance was again foreshadowed by Noboru hearing her voice. As Kuchisake-onna leaves with Mika, Mika knocks her mask off, revealing the woman's disfigured face.

At school, Noboru shows Kyōko a thirty-year-old photograph of a woman who looks like Kuchisake-onna. Noboru hears the voice again and traces it to a house, and he and Kyōko save a boy from Kuchisake-onna, whom Kyōko seemingly kills with a knife. Kuchisake-onna's body turns into that of a housewife, revealing that the spirit acts by possessing other women, whose possession is signified by them developing a cough.

Noboru tells Kyōko that the woman in the photo is Taeko Matsuzaki, his deceased mother, a sickly and unhinged woman who would physically abuse him and his siblings. One day, Taeko "disappeared" after killing Noboru's siblings, and after that, rumors and sightings of Kuchisake-onna began. Kuchisake-onna has now possessed the mother of Mika's friend, Natsuki. Natsuki is taken to Kuchisake-onna's lair, where the spirit cuts her mouth and murders the boy she had abducted from the playground. Mika saves Natsuki but she is traumatized and injured.

Kyōko looks through information on Kuchisake-onna and finds a note stating that the ghost's hideout is a deserted house with a red roof, a description that matches Noboru's childhood home. Noboru remembers that his mother tried to have him mercy kill her, telling him that if he did not, she would come back and haunt others. Instead, Noboru slit his mother's mouth and stabbed her, then dressed her body up in a coat and mask, and hid it in the closet.

Kyōko and Noboru find Mika in the house's basement, and are attacked by Kuchisake-onna. Kuchisake-onna captures Noboru and Mika and brutalizes them. Kyōko stabs the spirit in the neck, killing and leaving behind the body of Natsuki's mother. Mika's mother becomes the new host. Noboru fends off the spirit but is fatally wounded. Before dying, he beheads her, convinced that doing so will finally vanquish her. The decapitation fails to stop Kuchisake-onna, as the only way to defeat Kuchisake-onna is to obliterate Taeko's corpse in the closet, and the spirit takes over Kyōko while she is visiting her daughter.

Cast

 Miki Mizuno as Taeko Matsuzaki / Kuchisake-onna
Eriko Sato as Kyōko Yamashita
 Haruhiko Kato as Noboru Matsuzaki
 Younger version portrayed by Hiroto Ito
 Chiharu Kawai as Mayumi Sasaki
 Rie Kuwana as Mika Sasaki
 Sakina Kuwae as Natsuki Tamura
 Yûto Kawase as Masatoshi Kita
 Saaya Irie as Shiho Nakajima
 Runa Okada as Shiho's friend
 Rio Iguchi as Shiho's friend
 Kazuyuki Matsuzawa as Hideo Tamura
 Kaori Sakagami as Saori Tamura
 Ryoko Takizawa as Kazuko Yoshida
 Mei Tanaka as Yukiko Yoshida
 Aoi Shimoyama as Shingo Kuwabata
 Yūrei Yanagi as Detective Kubo
 Kōichirō Nishi as Kyōko's Ex-Husband
 Hiroto Itō as Young Noboru Matsuzaki
 Ayu Kanesaki as Ai Ôno

Release
The film was released on DVD by Tartan Video on Aug 14, 2007. Tartan later re-released the film as a part of a 3-disk 
combo pack with Sheitan, and Slaughter Night on Oct 13, 2009. It was last released on DVD by E1 Entertainment on Oct 11, 2011.

Critical reception
Russell Edwards of Variety gave the film a mixed review, describing it as a "low-budget chiller that is unlikely to join the international remake stampede", though he noted that it "has an unsettling quality that transcends its cheap origins". Adam Hakari, a member of the Online Film Critics Society, gave the film 2.5 out of 4 stars, writing that it "does a passable job of touching upon some heavy issues while not forgetting to sate the appetite of gorehound fans. Still, the film so often comes close to greatness that viewers may find themselves disappointed when their expectations are -- pardon the pun -- cut short."

Andre Manseau of Arrow in the Head gave the film a score of 3 out of 4, calling it "risky, brutal and unsettling" and "a good film that is intense and scary". Adrian Halen of HorrorNews.net gave the film 3.5 out of 5 stars, commending Mizuno's performance and writing that "A top contender for becoming a classic, Carved is a story that adds a new mythos into the horror arena." Justin Felix of DVD Talk awarded the film 3 out of 5 stars, writing that "The central protagonists are not conceived well, but the titular antagonist is - and there's atmosphere enough to get the audience to the end point."

Prequel
A prequel to Carved, titled Carved 2: The Scissors Massacre, was released in 2008. It is also known under the titles Carved 2, A Slit-Mouthed Woman 2, and Kuchisake-onna 2.

References

External links
 
 
 

2007 films
2007 horror films
Films about child abuse
Films about educators
Films based on urban legends
Films directed by Kōji Shiraishi
Films set in abandoned houses
Films set in Japan
Films shot in Japan
2000s ghost films
Japanese haunted house films
Japanese horror films
2000s Japanese-language films
Japanese slasher films
Japanese supernatural horror films
Films about curses
Japanese serial killer films
Japanese splatter films
2000s Japanese films